Fujikawa Station is the name of two train stations in Japan:

 Fujikawa Station (Aichi) (藤川駅)
 Fujikawa Station (Shizuoka) (富士川駅)